Swallow was launched at Calcutta in 1813. She sailed to England and then traded between England and India under a license from the British East India Company (EIC) through 1824. She returned to Calcutta registry and at some point after 1824 was sold in Java.

Career
In 1813 the EIC had lost its monopoly on the trade between India and Britain. British ships were then free to sail to India or the Indian Ocean under a license from the EIC. 

Swallow first appeared in Lloyd's Register  (LR) in 1815. 

Swallow was no longer listed in LR after 1824.

Fate
At some point Swallow was sold to new owners in Java.

Citations and references
Citations

References
 
 

1813 ships
British ships built in India
Age of Sail merchant ships of England